Thayer is a city in Oregon County, Missouri, United States. The population was 1,883 at the 2020 census. Its original name was Augusta.

History
A post office called Thayer has been in operation since 1884. The community has the name of Nathaniel Thayer, a railroad promoter.

Thayer is considered a railroad town, as it was laid out in 1882 to be a division point. At the turn of the 20th century, 400 railroad men lived in Thayer. Currently, the Burlington Northern Santa Fe railroad travels through town.

Geography
Thayer is located at  (36.524275, -91.543895).

Thayer is located next to Mammoth Spring, Arkansas.  Both towns are interconnected in many ways, but have different governing bodies and school systems.

Demographics

2010 census
As of the census of 2010, there were 2,243 people, 955 households, and 565 families living in the city. The racial makeup of the city was 96.39% White, 0.09% Black or African American, 0.94% Native American, 0.36% Asian, 0.04% Native Hawaiian or Pacific Islander, 0.18% from other races, and 2.01% from two or more races. Hispanic or Latino of any race were 1.65% of the population.

There were 955 households, of which 28.1% had children under the age of 18 living with them, 42.4% were married couples living together, 11.6% had a female householder with no husband present, 5.1% had a male householder with no wife present, and 40.8% were non-families. 36.1% of all households were made up of individuals, and 16.6% had someone living alone who was 65 years of age or older. The average household size was 2.27 and the average family size was 2.93.

The median age in the city was 42.7 years. 23.5% of residents were under the age of 18; 8.8% were between the ages of 18 and 24; 20.3% were from 25 to 44; 26.5% were from 45 to 64; and 21% were 65 years of age or older. The gender makeup of the city was 46.9% male and 53.1% female.

2000 census
As of the census of 2000, there were 2,201 people, 931 households, and 571 families living in the city. The population density was 1,013.2 people per square mile (391.6/km). There were 1,102 housing units at an average density of 507.3/sq mi (196.1/km). The racial makeup of the city was 96.50% White, 0.09% African American, 1.50% Native American, 0.09% Asian, 0.05% Pacific Islander, 0.14% from other races, and 1.64% from two or more races. Hispanic or Latino of any race were 1.68% of the population.

There were 931 households, out of which 28.2% had children under the age of 18 living with them, 47.2% were married couples living together, 11.0% had a female householder with no husband present, and 38.6% were non-families. 36.1% of all households were made up of individuals, and 19.5% had someone living alone who was 65 years of age or older. The average household size was 2.26 and the average family size was 2.91.

In the city the population was spread out, with 25.0% under the age of 18, 8.5% from 18 to 24, 23.1% from 25 to 44, 21.0% from 45 to 64, and 22.4% who were 65 years of age or older. The median age was 40 years. For every 100 females, there were 81.8 males. For every 100 females age 18 and over, there were 77.0 males.

The median income for a household in the city was $18,648, and the median income for a family was $24,464. Males had a median income of $22,273 versus $16,364 for females. The per capita income for the city was $12,278. About 23.0% of families and 27.2% of the population were below the poverty line, including 37.4% of those under age 18 and 25.8% of those age 65 or over.

Education
Public education in Thayer is administered by Thayer R-II School District.

Thayer has a public library, the Thayer Branch Library.

References

External links

 Historic maps of Thayer in the Sanborn Maps of Missouri Collection at the University of Missouri

Cities in Oregon County, Missouri
Cities in Missouri